"Seems Fine" is a 2004 single by Swedish indie pop band The Concretes.

Track listing
"Seems Fine"
"Just Locals"
"Chico" (Avalanches' Wernham Hogg Remix)
"Seems Fine" (Video)

Release history
Promo CD, LFSDJ011 ("Seems Fine" and "Just Locals" only)
CD-single, LFS013
CD-single, LFSX013 ("Seems Fine" and "Just Locals" only)
7" vinyl, LF7013 ("Seems Fine" and "Just Locals" only)

Charts

References

2004 singles
2004 songs